The Citroën Berlingo and Peugeot Partner are a range of multi-purpose vehicles produced by the PSA Group and later by Stellantis. They are sold both as panel vans for use as commercial vehicles and as a passenger variant with rear seats and windows. The third generation is also sold as the Opel/Vauxhall Combo, as the Toyota ProAce City from 2019 and as the Fiat Doblò from 2022.

The panel vans are available in passenger versions named the Berlingo Multispace and Partner Combi, Partner Tepee, and Peugeot Rifter for the third generation. In Italy, the first generation of the Partner was known as the Peugeot Ranch. They were initially based on the Citroën ZX/Peugeot 306 estate floorpan and mechanicals.

With their rectangular, box like cargo space and aerodynamic front, conceptually they can be considered the descendants of the Citroën 2CV panel van (AK400). The new 2018 Citroën Berlingo and Peugeot Partner/Rifter also share their design with the new Vauxhall/Opel Combo, following GM's stake acquisition in PSA.

Both the Berlingo and Partner have been produced in CNG and electric versions and with four-cylinder petrol and diesel engines.



First generation (M49; 1996) 

The Berlingo/Partner was officially launched in July 1996.

When the Berlingo was first shown at the Mondial de l'Automobile (Paris Motor Show) in 1996, a set of three concept cars was also presented:
Berlingo Coupé de Plage
Berlingo Berline Bulle
Berlingo Grand Large
The Berline Bulle concept was a roomy small car, that could be considered as a precursor for the C3. Only one of these concepts was actually developed, the Grand Large version, which was developed into the Multispace and Combi people carriers/leisure vans.

Until 2010, the pre-facelift models were still produced in Argentina. The updated model finally arrived this year.

Facelift (M59; 2003) 
A revised version, featuring a new instrument cluster, as seen in the Peugeot 206, redesigned interior and front end, was released in December 2002 (Berlingo I / Partner I).

During 2004, there was a minor facelift, including changes to the grille and light clusters.

After the launch of the second generation Berlingo and Rifter, the first generation models stayed offered. They took the names "Citroën Berlingo First" and "Peugeot Partner Origin".

In 2010, the Citroën Berlingo First Electrique and the Peugeot Partner Origin Electric were launched. These two electric vans were powered by the Monégasque firm Venturi, which assembled them in Solesmes, Sarthe.

In Argentina, Peugeot launched an off-road version of its Partner, called Partner Patagónica. This model had various names when it was sold across Europe in the 2000s, including Partner Ushuaïa Grand Raid, Partner Escapade, Partner Grande Escapade, Partner VTC, Partner Indiana, and others.

From 2013, the Berlingo and the Partner were discontinued in Europe. Both LCV and passenger versions continued their career in South America, where they are still produced years after.

Passenger vans Berlingo Multispace and Partner Patagónica received an update in June 2021. More parts of both vehicles are now manufactured locally. It means they now have barn doors (already manufactured locally for LCV Berlingo and Partner), replacing their tailgate that was imported from Europe.

The Berlingo and the Partner got a minor facelift in January 2023. The Berlingo adopted an updated Citroën logo (until there it still used the sharp logo from before 2009) and a new grill, in plastic. The Partner adopted the same grill and lost the piece of chrome around its front logo.

Engines 
The vans were designed to be powered by petrol, diesel, electric, or CNG.

Electric version 
The first-generation Berlingo was available first with a nickel-cadmium battery (Citroën Berlingo Electrique) from 1998 to 2005. After that was discontinued, a small electric fleet was built for La Poste using the first-generation Berlingo chassis, equipped with a ZEBRA molten salt battery and a powertrain from Venturi Automobiles; this fleet was delivered in 2010.

Second generation (B9; 2008)

Two different models replaced the first generation of the Peugeot Partner and Citroën Berlingo in 2008, a smaller vehicle (the Citroën Nemo/Peugeot Bipper, which also replaced recently discontinued Citroën C15 First) and larger (the Citroën Berlingo II/Peugeot Partner II).

The Berlingo II, styled by Gilles Vidal, is based on PSA's Platform 2 (like the Citroën ) and therefore is slightly larger, and considerably more expensive than its predecessor. The engine range is similar to other current models of the PSA Group.

The Berlingo and Partner were officially unveiled in January 2008, with the Berlingo launched first, in the European market, in April 2008, followed by the Partner in May 2008. Mexico sold this generation alongside the original Partner, as do a few other countries, as the Grand Raid and Partner Origin.

An electric version with a traction motor and battery derived from the Mitsubishi i-MiEV was available from 2013. In March 2017, a five-seater Citroen e-Berlingo Multispace was announced.

Russia

This generation is also manufactured and sold in Russia as the Peugeot Partner (and as the passenger oriented Peugeot Partner Crossway), Citroën Berlingo (and Citroën Berlingo Multispace) and exclusive Opel Combo Cargo (and Opel Combo Life) since March 2021.

Engines

Third generation (K9; 2018) 

The third generation Berlingo and a new Peugeot Rifter was officially unveiled at the 2018 Geneva Auto Show. The model is also sold as the fourth generation Opel and Vauxhall Combo after the PSA Group bought Opel in March 2017 and, from the end of 2019, as the Toyota ProAce City, following the extension of the partnership in utility vehicles between PSA and Toyota. The ProAce City was officially unveiled at the 2019 Commercial Vehicle Show in Birmingham. The Fiat-badged version was released as the Fiat Doblò in June 2022 in both ICE and e-Doblò electric version.

The third generation Berlingo is the first of the nameplate to be launched in Japan, in October 2019.

In January 2022, Stellantis stops marketing the internal combustion versions (diesel and gasoline) of its passenger vans in United Kingdom, Norway and European Union countries. This decision is motivated by a decision to reduce the average  emissions of vehicles marketed by the company in Europe in accordance with EU regulations on emissions. As a result, the Berlingo, Rifter and Combo Life are now only offered in their battery electric version. Panel vans are not affected by this change, nor are Toyota-badged models, as the Japanese manufacturer is in line with the objectives of the CAFE regulations. The internal combustion variants of the Stellantis passenger vans are expected to return in 2023 with a mild-hybrid system.

Electric versions

On 14 January 2021, Citroën unveiled the electric ë-Berlingo Van, which was followed 6 days later by the Opel Combo-e Cargo and the Vauxhall Combo-e, and again 6 days later by the Peugeot e-Partner. On 26 February 2021 Peugeot introduced e-Rifter, and on 4 May 2021, Toyota unveiled ProAce City Electric and ProAce City Verso Electric.

Variants

Berlingo Fourgonnette 
Manufactured by the Italian firm Caselani and developed on the basis of the Citroën Berlingo, it is a modern reinterpretation of the 2CV A. It was presented at the 2022 Paris Motor Show.

Commercial versions

Passenger versions

Worldwide sales and production

See also 
 Berlin (carriage)

References

External links 

 Official Citroën Berlingo web page
 Peugeot Partner Tepee Outdoor Exterior and Interior Full 3D HD
 Peugeot Partner Tepee Active MPV 1.6HDI 92 Exterior and Interior in Full 3D HD

Berlingo
Euro NCAP small MPVs
Vans
Electric vans
Cars introduced in 1996
Cars of Turkey
Cars of Portugal
Cars of Argentina
Pickup trucks
Production electric cars
Front-wheel-drive vehicles